The Northeast 8 Athletic Conference (NE8) is an OHSAA athletic league that began competition for the 2018-19 school year.  It is primarily made up of members that were part of the All-American Conference along with previously independent South Range.

Members

History
The idea for the NE8 was created in May 2017 when members of the All-American Conference's Blue and White divisions decided to break away and form their own league.  South Range had previously been set to join the newly-created Eastern Buckeye Conference in 2018, but then received an invitation to join the AAC Blue tier with Crestview High School at the same time they were invited to join the NE8.  With three league invitations, South Range decided to help form the Northeast 8.

The first NE8 Cross Country Championships were held at Niles Stephens Park on October 10, 2018.  In the high school meet, the boys individual champion was Luke Baun from South Range High School and the girls individual champion was Jackie Grisdale from Poland High School.  Team championships were won by Niles High School boys and Poland High School girls.  In the middle school meet, the girls champion was Tara Wine from South Range High School.

In January 2022, Jefferson announced that they would be leaving the NE8 after five  years to join the Chagrin Valley Conference in 2023.  No replacements for them have been announced.

References

Sports organizations established in 2018
Ohio high school sports conferences
2018 establishments in Ohio